School Grove Lake is a lake in the U.S. state of Minnesota.

School Grove Lake was named on account of it being located in school section 36.

References

Lakes of Minnesota
Lakes of Lyon County, Minnesota
Lakes of Yellow Medicine County, Minnesota